Adam Leipzig is the CEO of Entertainment Media Partners, an American film and theatre producer and executive, as well as an author. As a former Disney executive, he supervised such films as Dead Poets Society (1989) and Honey, I Shrunk the Kids (1989). He went on to produce such films as Titus (1999), The Way Back (2010) and A Plastic Ocean (2016). While president of National Geographic Films, he acquired the international rights to March of the Penguins and created the US version, which won the Academy Award for Best Documentary Feature. He is the author of two books on film making.
 
Leipzig is credited with pioneering the art of turning nature documentaries into "box office gold" by upgrading the production values and voice over narrative.
 
Leipzig currently serves as CEO of MediaU, an online learning center in the domain of filmmaking and television. Leipzig is also Founder of Cultural Daily (former Cultural Weekly), a daily digital publication and media project for participatory civic journalism. He lectures in the MBA and Executive Education programs at the University of California Berkeley Haas School of Business.

Early life and education
Adam Leipzig grew up in Reseda, Los Angeles, a neighborhood in San Fernando Valley, California. He attended Yale University and graduated with a B.A. degree in literature in 1979. He also trained as Fellow in Arts and Public Policy at Coro Foundation.
After graduating from Yale, Leipzig began his career in the Los Angeles Theatre Center (formerly the Los Angeles Actors’ Theatre) as an unpaid assistant stage manager, where he eventually became a dramaturge/associate director.

Theater
In 1984, he was one of the members of Los Angeles theatre companies that successfully negotiated with the Los Angeles Olympic Arts Festival for local theatre inclusion in the festival. In 1985 the Los Angeles Actors’ Theatre changed its name to the Los Angeles Theatre Center and moved to a four-theatre performing arts complex in downtown Los Angeles.
 
Leipzig was involved in plays by Dario Fo, Jon Robin Baitz, David Henry Hwang, Miguel Piñero, Joyce Carol Oates, Charles Marowitz, William Mastrosimone, Steve Carter, Michael Frayn, Marlene Meyer and Emmanuel Fried. He was one of the producers of Secret Honor, written by Donald Freed and Arnold M. Stone and directed by Robert Altman, which Altman had also made into a 1984 film of the same name. Leipzig left his staff position at the Theatre Center in 1986, but continued to consult and do translations for the company. Leipzig worked with Iranian theatre artist Reza Abdoh, and after Abdoh's death in 1995 organized the archiving of his works. In 1999, Leipzig was responsible for the Internet success of Bang, Bang, You’re Dead by William Mastrosimone. He also produced two plays by Donald Freed: American Iliad (2001) and The Einstein Plan (2010).

Filmmaking
Leipzig joined Walt Disney Studios/Touchstone Pictures as a creative executive in 1987 and in 1991 was promoted to senior vice president of motion picture production. Films he supervised included Dead Poets Society, Good Morning, Vietnam, The Doctor, Billy Bathgate, Honey, I Shrunk the Kids, Honey, I Blew Up the Kid, 3 Ninjas, The Program, Mad Love, Fire Birds and Paradise. He left to become a producer with PolyGram Entertainment's Interscope Communications in 1993, where he produced films including The Associate, Roommates, Two Much and Dead Silence. Leipzig started his own production company called Terra Bella Entertainment in 1999, where he produced films including Titus and I Was a Teenage Faust.
 
In 2003 Leipzig became president of National Geographic Films, where he supervised acquisition and distribution of films including March of The Penguins, The Story of the Weeping Camel, Amreeka, Kekexili: Mountain Patrol and God Grew Tired of Us; and he produced The Way Back , The Last Lions and Arctic Tale. In October, 2008, National Geographic Films announced $100 million in financing with an equity investment from Abu Dhabi Media Company and a credit facility from JP Morgan. Leipzig left National Geographic Films in March, 2010.
 
In 2014 he founded Entertainment Media Partners, a film consultancy, that also produces films, such as A Plastic Ocean. From 2015-2016, Leipzig served as the Chief Operating Officer of CreativeFuture, a non-profit organization that advocates for creative communities, and is currently their Senior Creative Adviser. He also serves on the advisory board of the philanthropic social media platform and app, Pixhug.

March of the Penguins
Leipzig is credited with creating a new genre by showing the potential to turn a nature film into "box office gold" by taking a French nature film about penguins and retrofitting the didactic documentary for the American market, with features that included adding "Morgan Freeman's voice-of-God commentary and a new music score." The Los Angeles Times characterized this "new genre of wildlife film-making" as a "hybrid that takes natural events and dress(es) them up for mass consumption... the effect is not unlike boosting brown rice with a little nacho cheese sauce, or customizing a Prius for drift- racing." As Adam Leipzig rationalized his approach in the same article, "Traditional documentaries are not entertaining enough anymore and don't really appeal to a wide enough audience. We really are trying to expand and create new genres of storytelling."
 
According to the reviewer for the Los Angeles Times, "March of the Penguins, narrated by Morgan Freeman, is no typical nature documentary: It has elements of romantic drama, romantic comedy, suspense and even, however briefly, a happy, Hollywood-like ending."
 
In 2005, when he was at National Geographic, Leipzig was co-producer of March of the Penguins; the film was a major box office success, made $77 million domestically and over $133 million worldwide to become the second-highest grossing documentary of all time and won the Academy Award for Best Documentary. Leipzig became aware of the film when it was being shot in Antarctica and negotiated with the film's U.S. distributor Warner Independent, to purchase the film at Sundance for $1 million and create a new English-language version with narration voiced by Morgan Freeman (written by Jordan Roberts) and a new musical score composed by Alex Wurman. The film's success marked a turning point for National Geographic.

Teaching
Leipzig is on faculty at the University of California Berkeley Haas School of Business, where he teaches in the MBA and Executive Education programs, and at Chapman University's Dodge College of Film and Media Arts.

Public speaking 
Leipzig has given two TEDx Talks. "The Real Culture Wars" was given at TEDx Fullerton in 2010. His next talk, given in 2013, "How to Know Your Life Purpose in 5 Minutes," is one of the most popular TEDx Talks of all time, with more than 15 million views.

Articles
Leipzig has written for American Theatre, Written By, Screen International, and High Performance, and he was the founding editor of Theatre LA magazine. In 2005 Leipzig wrote two articles for The New York Times about how the movie business works for theatrical and home video releases.

Bibliography 
 Inside Track for Independent Filmmakers: Get Your Movie Made, Get Your Movie Seen (2013, Macmillan)
 Filmmaking in Action: Your Guide to the Skills and Craft, a comprehensive textbook (2016, Macmillan) - written with Barry S. Weiss and Michael Goldman.

Filmography

References

External links
 
 Cultural Daily
 Entertainment Media Partners
 MediaU
 Next Echo Foundation

1958 births
American film producers
American theatre managers and producers
Living people
National Geographic Society
Yale University alumni